Amaracarpus is a genus of shrubs, treelets or trees in the family Rubiaceae. It was described by Carl Ludwig Blume in 1826. Most of the species are endemic to New Guinea but a few have wider ranges in Southeast Asia from Myanmar (Burma) and the Andaman Islands across Thailand, Malaysia, Indonesia, the Philippines, Melanesia, Christmas Island, Queensland and Vanuatu. One species also occurs in the Seychelles. Several species were published years ago but are today not represented by any type specimens or other known existing material.

Species

 Amaracarpus acuminatus S.Moore - New Guinea
 Amaracarpus anomalus Wernham - New Guinea
 Amaracarpus attenuatus Merr. & L.M.Perry - New Guinea
 Amaracarpus belensis Merr. & L.M.Perry - Seram, New Guinea
 Amaracarpus brassii Merr. & L.M.Perry - New Guinea
 Amaracarpus braunianus (Warb. ex Boerl.) Valeton - New Guinea
 Amaracarpus calcicola Merr. & L.M.Perry - New Guinea
 Amaracarpus compactus Merr. & L.M.Perry - New Guinea
 Amaracarpus cuneifolius Valeton - New Guinea
 Amaracarpus doormanniensis Valeton - New Guinea
 Amaracarpus floribundus Valeton - New Guinea
 Amaracarpus grandiflorus A.P.Davis - Maluku
 Amaracarpus grandifolius Valeton - Maluku, New Guinea, Solomons, Bismarcks
 Amaracarpus idenburgensis Merr. & L.M.Perry - New Guinea
 Amaracarpus kochii Valeton - New Guinea
 Amaracarpus ledermannii Valeton - New Guinea
 Amaracarpus major (Valeton) A.P.Davis - New Guinea
 Amaracarpus montanus Valeton - New Guinea
 Amaracarpus nematopodus (F.Muell) P.I.Forst. - New Guinea, Queensland, Vanuatu
 Amaracarpus nouhuizii (Valeton) Valeton - New Guinea
 Amaracarpus novoguineensis (Warb. ex Boerl.) Valeton - New Guinea
 Amaracarpus nymanii Valeton - Papua New Guinea
 Amaracarpus papuanus Valeton - New Guinea
 Amaracarpus pubescens Blume - Seychelles, Andaman & Nicobar Islands, Myanmar, Thailand, Malaysia, Indonesia (Borneo, Sumatra, Java, Maluku, Lesser Sunda Islands, Sulawesi), Philippines, Christmas Island, Irian Jaya
 Amaracarpus rhombifolius Valeton - New Guinea
 Amaracarpus schlechteri Valeton - New Guinea
 Amaracarpus syzygifolius Valeton - New Guinea
 Amaracarpus trichocalyx Valeton - New Guinea
 Amaracarpus wichmannii Valeton - New Guinea
 Amaracarpus xanthocarpus Merr. & L.M.Perry - New Guinea

References

External links 
 Amaracarpus in the World Checklist of Rubiaceae

Rubiaceae genera
Psychotrieae